The Grumman F2F was a single-engine, biplane fighter aircraft with retractable undercarriage, serving as the standard fighter for the United States Navy between 1936 and 1940. It was designed for both carrier- and land-based operations.

Design and development
Grumman's success with the two-seat FF-1, which was significantly faster than even the single-seat fighters of its time, resulted in a contract for the single-seat XF2F-1. Armed with two .30 caliber (7.62 mm) machine guns above the cowl, the new design also incorporated watertight compartments to reduce weight and improve survivability in the event of a water landing. Maneuverability also proved superior to the earlier two-seat aircraft.

Operational history
The Navy ordered 54 F2F-1 fighters on 17 May 1934, with the first aircraft delivered 19 January 1935. One additional aircraft (BuNo 9997) was ordered to replace one which crashed on 16 March 1935, bringing the total to 55, with the final F2F-1 delivered on 2 August 1935. The F2F-1 had a relatively long service life for the time, serving in front-line squadrons from 1935 to late 1939, when squadrons began to receive the F3F-3 as a replacement. By September 1940, the F2F had been completely replaced in fighter squadrons and was relegated to training and utility duties. The last F2F-1s were stricken from the list of naval aircraft in early 1943.

Variants
XF2F-1
United States Navy designation for the Grumman Model G-8 prototype with a  XR-1534-44 Twin Wasp Junior radial engine, one built
F2F-1
Production variant with a  R-1535-72 Twin Wasp Junior radial engine, 55 built

Operators

 
 United States Navy
VF-2B
VF-3B
VF-5B
VB-5B
VF-2
VF-5
VF-7
NAS Seattle
NAS Coco Solo
NAS Alameda
NAS Pearl Harbor
 United States Marine Corps
VF-4M
VMF-2

Specifications (Grumman F2F-1)

See also

References

Citations

Bibliography

 Cacutt, Len, ed. “Grumman Single-Seat Biplane Fighters.” Great Aircraft of the World. London: Marshall Cavendish, 1989. .
 Dann, Richard LCDR, ed. “Grumman Biplane Fighters in Action.” Carrollton, TX: Squadron Signal, 1993. .
 Graff, Cory. F6F Hellcat at War. New York: Zenith Imprint, 2009. .
 Swanborough, Gordon and Peter M. Bowers. United States Navy Aircraft since 1911. London: Putnam, Second edition, 1976. .

External links

F02F
1930s United States fighter aircraft
Single-engined tractor aircraft
Biplanes
Carrier-based aircraft
Aircraft first flown in 1933